Kataf may refer to:
the name of the Atyap people in the Hausa language
Kataf, Iran, a village